Livingston South railway station is one of two railway stations serving Livingston in West Lothian, Scotland. It is managed by ScotRail, who provide all train services.

The town of Livingston also has another railway station, on the North Clyde Line.

History 
The station was opened by British Rail on 6 October 1984. The station has two platforms, connected by a subway, which was originally a cattle creep under the railway embankment at this point. The platforms were of timber construction.

In April 2018 the station underwent a £3.5 million transformation to upgrade it as part of a project to electrify the Edinburgh Waverley-Glasgow Central line.

Services 
In 2010 it was served, Monday to Saturday, by one service each hour from Glasgow Central to Edinburgh Waverley. An additional hourly 'semi fast' service also now (May 2016) calls, giving the station a frequency of two trains per hour between Edinburgh and Glasgow.

There is a limited Sunday service at this station to Edinburgh and Glasgow (six trains each way per day).

The staple passenger traction on services using this station is the Class 385  EMU.

References

Notes

Sources 

 
 
 

Railway stations in West Lothian
Railway stations opened by British Rail
Railway stations in Great Britain opened in 1984
Railway stations served by ScotRail